Suhodoll i Poshtëm (in Albanian) or Donji Suvi Do (in  is a village in the municipality of Mitrovica in the District of Mitrovica, Kosovo. According to the 2011 census, it has 789 inhabitants, of whom 787 are Albanians. It is part of the cadastral municipality of Suvi Do, and is physionomically connected to Suhodolli i Epërm.

See also 
 Mitrovica Lake
 Mitrovica, Kosovo

Notes

References

Sources

Villages in Mitrovica, Kosovo